Charles Lawrence Ausburne (July 26, 1889 – October 17, 1917) enlisted in the United States Navy February 25, 1908.

As an Electrician First Class, Ausburne manned the emergency wireless station in the Army transport , and following the ship's fatal torpedoing October 17, 1917 by U-105, stood to his duty until the ship sank beneath him. His gallantry was recognized in the posthumous award of the Navy Cross.

Two ships of the U.S. Navy have been named in his honor. Since other family members spelled their name as Ausburn, the first ship was named .  It was later found that he himself spelled his surname as Ausburne, and the second ship was named .

External links

 www.history.navy.mil: USS Charles Ausburne
 Charles Lawrence Ausburne - U.S. Navy Hero at home.insightbb.com

1889 births
1917 deaths
Recipients of the Navy Cross (United States)
People from New Orleans
American military personnel killed in World War I
Deaths due to shipwreck at sea
United States Navy personnel of World War I
United States Navy sailors
Military personnel from Louisiana